The Hepatitis C virus (HCV) cis-acting replication element (CRE) is an RNA element which is found in the coding region of the RNA-dependent RNA polymerase NS5B. Mutations in this family have been found to cause a blockage in RNA replication and it is thought that both the primary sequence and the structure of this element are crucial for HCV RNA replication.

See also 
 Hepatitis C alternative reading frame stem-loop
 Hepatitis C virus 3'X element
 Hepatitis C virus stem-loop VII
 Hepatitis C stem-loop IV
 Hepatitis C

References

External links 
 

Cis-regulatory RNA elements
Hepatitis C virus